Selkirk Water Aerodrome  is an aerodrome located  north of Selkirk, Manitoba, Canada.

See also
Selkirk Airport

References

Registered aerodromes in Manitoba
Selkirk, Manitoba
Seaplane bases in Manitoba